Julie Young is an American educator and academic administrator specialized in virtual schooling. She is the vice president of education outreach and student services at the Arizona State University (ASU) and the managing director of the ASU Preparatory Academy. Young founded the Florida Virtual School in 1997 and served as its president and chief executive officer until 2014.

Life 
Young was raised in Lexington, Kentucky. She completed a B.A. in elementary education at the University of Kentucky. Young moved to Florida at the age of 21 and earned a M.Ed. in administration and supervision from the University of South Florida.

Young began teaching at San Carlos Park Elementary School in San Carlos Park, Florida.  In 1989, Young was an elementary school teacher in Fort Myers, Florida. She led a technological initiative between the school district and IBM. For two years, Young worked as a teacher on assignment for IBM where she trained teachers throughout the school district. In 1996, she was hired as an assistant principal at Tildenville Elementary in Tildenville, Florida. Before that school year began, Bob Williams, the associate superintendent, hired Young to lead a technology grant to develop an online high school. The $200,000 "Break the Mold Grant" from the Florida Department of Education was awarded to Orange County and Alachua County, Florida. Young founded the Florida Virtual School in 1997 and served as its president and chief executive officer until 2014.

In 2006, Young was a board member of the United States Distance Learning Association. She was a pioneer in the field of virtual schools.

In 2017, Young joined Arizona State University (ASU) to assist with the launch of ASU Prep Digital. She is the managing director of the Arizona State University Preparatory Academy. Young is also the ASU vice president of education outreach and student services. 

Young is a recipient of the Harold W. McGraw Prize in Education.

Personal life 
Young is married and has two sons.

References

Citations

Bibliography

External links 

 

Living people
Place of birth missing (living people)
Year of birth missing (living people)
21st-century American women educators
21st-century American educators
American chief executives of education-related organizations
21st-century American businesswomen
21st-century American businesspeople
Businesspeople from Lexington, Kentucky
Businesspeople from Florida
University of Kentucky alumni
University of South Florida alumni
Arizona State University faculty
American academic administrators
American women academics
Women academic administrators